James Flanagan (10 April 1870 – 24 September 1933) was an Irish sportsperson. He played hurling with his local club Tubberadora and was a member of the Tipperary senior hurling team between 1895 and 1898.

Honours

Tipperary
All-Ireland Senior Hurling Championship (2): 1895, 1896
Munster Senior Hurling Championship (2): 1895, 1896

References

1870 births
1933 deaths
Tubberadora hurlers
Tipperary inter-county hurlers
All-Ireland Senior Hurling Championship winners